Callopistria pulchrilinea is a moth of the family Noctuidae. It is widely distributed from the Oriental region to Africa, including Japan, Taiwan, China (Tibet), India, Sri Lanka, Vietnam, Myanmar, Borneo, Singapore, Indonesia (Amboina), Nepal and western Africa (Gabon).

The wingspan is 24–25 mm for males and 22–23 mm for females. The forewing ground colour is rufous in males and brownish-dark in females, tinged with ochreous on the veins.

The larvae have been recorded feeding on Selaginella uncinata and Selaginella delicatula. Full-grown larvae have a light green ground colour.

References

Moths described in 1862
Caradrinini
Moths of Asia
Moths of Africa